Joan M. Plaisted (born August 29, 1945) is an American diplomat. She is a career diplomat of the United States Foreign Service, and was the United States Ambassador to the Marshall Islands and Kiribati from 1995 to 2000 concurrently, while resident at Majuro.

Biography
Joan Plaisted was born on August 29, 1945 in St. Peter, Minnesota. She received her early education in Willmar, Minnesota, and earned her B.A in International Relations and M.A. in Asian Studies from the School of International Service at American University in Washington, D.C., in 1967, as well as graduating from the University of Grenoble in 1967. Prior to joining the U.S. Foreign Service, she started her career with the Department of Commerce working on Japan, Korea and the Pacific Islands. She joined the U.S. Foreign Service in 1973 and served as Office Director for Thailand and Burmese Affairs in the Department of State. From 1991 to 1994, she was Chargé d'affaires ad interim and Deputy Chief of Mission of the American Embassy in Rabat, Morocco. She also worked in Hong Kong and Paris. In Washington, Plaisted served in the Office of Chinese Affairs. She also served with the Executive Office of the President Office of the U.S. Trade Representative in Geneva, Switzerland.

On July 26, 1995, President Bill Clinton announced his intention to nominate Joan Plaisted as Ambassador the Republic of the Marshall Islands and the Republic of Kiribati. She was appointed on December 19, 1995, and served until her retirement on July 28, 2000. She became a United States Senior Advisor to the United Nations some time later, and remains politically active.

In May, 1993, she was awarded the American University's Lodestar Award as the school's most outstanding alumnus who best exemplifies the University's values. She is a graduate of the National War College Class of 1988 and is a recipient of the Department of State's Superior and Meritorious Honor Awards. She can speak French, as well as English.

References

Ambassadors of the United States to the Marshall Islands
Ambassadors of the United States to Kiribati
1945 births
Living people
United States Foreign Service personnel
People from St. Peter, Minnesota
American women ambassadors
American University School of International Service alumni
National War College alumni
Grenoble Alpes University alumni
20th-century American diplomats
20th-century American women
21st-century American women